Media evaluation is a discipline of the external and logical social sciences and centres on the analysis of media content, rating the exposure using a number of pre-designated criteria commonly including tonal value and presence of key messages. It is said to be one of the fastest-growing areas of mass communications research. 

The International Association for Measurement and Evaluation of Communication (AMEC) is the industry-appointed trade body for companies and individuals involved in research, measurement, and evaluation in editorial media coverage and related communications issues. To be a full member of AMEC, companies must be able to: a) offer comprehensive media evaluation, research, and interpretation services, b) have been in business for at least two years, and c) have media evaluation turnover in excess of £150,000 when applying. In addition, all companies abide by a strict code of ethics and must implement tight quality control procedures. These conditions ensure that the media evaluation services offered are all to the very highest standard. Another organisation is the Commission on Public Relations Measurement & Evaluation, which was formed under the auspices of the Institute for Public Relations in 1998. The Commission exists to establish standards and methods for public relations research and measurement, and to issue authoritative best-practices white papers.

References

Media studies
Social information processing
Mass media monitoring
Social media